Cement Mills Halt was a railway station between Cowes and Newport on the Isle of Wight. It was a public railway station throughout its life, although principally used by workers at the cement  works in Stag Lane. It was not included on public time tables but was available to ramblers visible enough on the primitive gas-lit platform to stop the train "on request". The trackway is now part of a national cycle route.

West Medina Cement Works 

Cement Mills Halt primarily served the West Medina Cement Works, which was owned and operated by Francis and Company Cement Manufacturers. Near the village of Northwood, was the extensive cement works of Messrs. Francis, Son, & Co., of Nine Elms, London, who employed about 100 people at the West Medina Cement Works in the manufacture of Portland and Medina cements. The Francis Co. had the contract to supply all the Portland cement for the construction of the fourth Eddystone Lighthouse.

References

See also 

 List of closed railway stations in Britain

Disused railway stations on the Isle of Wight
Former Isle of Wight Central Railway stations
Railway stations in Great Britain opened in 1909
Railway stations in Great Britain closed in 1966